Brick Kiln is a settlement in the east of the island of Nevis in Saint Kitts and Nevis. It is located inland from the coast in America, to the north of Butlers.

Populated places in Saint Kitts and Nevis